Cebu Strait (Tagalog: Kipot ng Cebú; also Bohol Strait) is a strait in the Central Visayas region in the Philippines.

Geography
The Cebu Strait (and its 3 channels, the Mactan, the Olango, & the Hilutangan) connects the western part of the Bohol Sea with the Camotes Sea, and separates the island provinces of Cebu and Bohol.

Transport
The strait is a major sea-lane connecting Cebu City on the strait's northern end with port cities in the south such as Dumaguete in Negros Oriental and Cagayan de Oro in Northern Mindanao.

Mactan Island, on the northern end of the strait, has Mactan International Airport, one of the major airports in the country.

See also
Canigao Channel - connects the eastern part of the Bohol Sea with the Camotes Sea
Tañon Strait - separates the islands of Negros and Cebu

References

Straits of the Philippines
Bohol Sea
Landforms of Cebu
Landforms of Bohol
Maritime Southeast Asia